DIA-style.com is a social commerce website for fashion that focuses on the Middle East.

The site is in both Arabic and English and it is best known for being the first site offering Arabic speaking consumers the ability to shop online for ready-to-wear and accessories from luxury brands and designers in their own language.

There are over 50,000 ready-to-wear and non-apparel pieces from over 1,200 designers, with brands including Gucci, Lanvin, Fendi, Peter Pilotto, Mary Katrantzou and 3.1 Phillip Lim.

History
DIA-style.com, launched in 2012, is based in London and is part of the DIA Digital a group of online businesses. It is a complementary sister site to DIA-BOUTIQUE.com which is a marketplace promoting ready-to-wear and accessories by independent designers from around the world.

DIA Digital sand its constituent companies were founded by Rasha Khouri, an online fashion entrepreneur from the investment banking sector.

References

External links
DIA-style.com Official site
The Elite Post

Online clothing retailers of the United Kingdom
British companies established in 2012